Héritier (from the French word héritier meaning heir) may refer to:
Charles Louis L'Héritier de Brutelle (1746–1800), botanist and taxonomist
Françoise Héritier (1933–2017), anthropologist
Heritier Lumumba (born 1986), Australian rules footballer
Louis L’Héritier, captain of the French ship Hercule
 L'Héritier (film), a 1973 film directed by Philippe Labro, starring Jean-Paul Belmondo